"Love Don't Let Me Go (Walking Away)" was released as a mash-up of DJ Tocadisco's remix of The Egg's single "Walking Away" with the vocals of Chris Willis from David Guetta's 2002 single "Love Don't Let Me Go". The mash-up was first performed live by French DJ and Guetta's production partner Joachim Garraud, though several people claimed to have done it before. It was featured in an advert for the Citroën C4, and peaked at number three on the UK Singles Chart, Guetta's first top ten hit in that country. It was released as the single of Guetta's 2006 compilation album Fuck Me I'm Famous - Ibiza Mix 06 and also features on the 2007 Reissue Edition of Guetta Blaster and as the bonus track of Guetta's third studio album Pop Life.

Music video
The music video, shot at Heygate Estate in South London, is choreographed around breakdancing and parkour with a comedic aspect. The clip starts with two boys playing basketball while two girls walk past. One of each of the two notice each other and are obviously infatuated. They walk up to the cage between them and when their hands touch they begin to dance intensely. They continue to dance energetically and spontaneously until they touched someone else, at which time the "energy" would transfer to them and that person would start to dance while the person who touched them stopped.

Track listing
 "Love Don't Let Me Go (Walking Away)" (UK radio edit) – 3:13
 "Love Don't Let Me Go (Walking Away)" (Famous radio edit) – 3:08
 "Love Don't Let Me Go (Walking Away)" (Joachim Garraud & David Guetta's F*** Me I'm Famous Mix) – 6:23
 "Walking Away" (Tocadisco Remix) – 6:53

Charts

External links
, Original Version.

References

2006 singles
Number-one singles in Spain
David Guetta songs
Songs written by David Guetta
Mashup songs
2006 songs
Songs written by Chris Willis
Songs written by Joachim Garraud
Song recordings produced by David Guetta